Nikolay Davydenko won in the final 6–4, 7–5, against Fernando Verdasco.

Seeds
The top four seeds receive a bye into the second round.

Draw

Finals

Top half

Bottom half

External links
 Main Draw
 Qualifying Draw

Proton Malaysian Open - Singles, 2009